Mohinder was a post-hardcore band from Cupertino, California. Despite their brief existence, they were considered an important feature of the California hardcore punk scene, and helped to define the musical genre now known as screamo. Mohinder songs tended to be short in duration, and are often characterized as being extremely intense and chaotic. Formed in 1993, they released only three 7 inch EPs before breaking up in 1994, all of which have posthumously been compiled onto a single compact disc discography compilation titled Everything by Gold Standard Laboratories in 2001. Members went on to such bands as Duster, Indian Summer, Jenny Piccolo, The Anasazi, Calm, A-Set, and Makara. Marc Bianchi would also later release indietronic music under the name Her Space Holiday.

Discography
Extended plays
O Nation, You Bleed From Many Wounds, 1896 7-inch (1993, Unleaded)
Mohinder/Nitwits split 7-inch (1994, Unleaded)
Mohinder 7-inch (1994, Gravity)
Transient Sequences 7-inch (1999, Unleaded)

Compilation albums
Everything LP/CD (2001, Gold Standard Laboratories)

Compilation appearances
We've Lost A Beauty: A Compilation For Christopher - "In Memory Of A Stranger" (1995, File 13)
Farmhouse Compilation '94 - "101" (1995, Farmhouse)

References

American post-hardcore musical groups
Musical groups from California
Musical groups established in 1993
Musical groups disestablished in 1994
1993 establishments in California